Apocalypse: Follow Us is the seventh Korean extended play by South Korean girl group Dreamcatcher. It was released on October 11, 2022, by Dreamcatcher Company, and distributed by Sony Music. Apocalypse: Follow Us features six tracks including the lead single "Vision", and is available in "T", "H", "E" versions and a platform version.

Background and release 
In September 2022, Dreamcatcher released an image of an unknown code word, This will be a comeback in October.

Track listing

Charts

Weekly charts

Monthly charts

Release history

Notes

References 

Dreamcatcher (group) albums
Sony Music albums
2022 albums
Korean-language albums